William Patrick Hogarty (February 16, 1840 - October 23, 1914) was an American soldier who fought in the American Civil War. Hogarty received his country's highest award for bravery during combat, the Medal of Honor. Hogarty's medal was won for his actions during two battles, in the Battle of Antietam, Maryland on September 17, 1862, and the Battle of Fredericksburg, Virginia on December 13, 1862. He was honored with the award on June 22, 1891.

Hogarty born in New York City, and joined the 23rd New York Infantry from Elmira, New York in May 1861. He was discharged in January 1863, but was commissioned as a second lieutenant with the Veteran Reserve Corps two years later. Despite his disability, he continued serving in the Army until retiring in December 1870.

Medal of Honor citation

See also
List of American Civil War Medal of Honor recipients: G–L

References

1840 births
1914 deaths
American amputees
American Civil War recipients of the Medal of Honor
Military personnel from New York City
People of New York (state) in the American Civil War
Union Army officers
United States Army Medal of Honor recipients